Ronald Spelbos (born 8 July 1954 in Utrecht) is a Dutch former football player and manager. He played central defense. He earned 21 caps for the Netherlands, scoring a goal in his last international, against Cyprus on October 28, 1987 in an 8-0 win that was later annulled because of crowd violence. He was a candidate to be selected for the Dutch team in the 1988 European Championships, but suffered a knee injury which ended his career.

Honours
 Eredivisie
Winners (2):  1981 & 1985
 KNVB Cup
Winners (5):  1978, 1981, 1982, 1986 & 1987
 UEFA Cup Winners' Cup
Winners (1):  1987

External links

International career

1954 births
Living people
Dutch footballers
Netherlands international footballers
AZ Alkmaar players
Club Brugge KV players
AFC Ajax players
Expatriate footballers in Belgium
Association football defenders
Footballers from Utrecht (city)
Dutch football managers
FC Utrecht managers
NAC Breda managers
Belgian Pro League players
Eredivisie players
Dutch expatriate footballers
Dutch expatriate sportspeople in Belgium
VV DOVO players
SBV Vitesse managers